Broad River may refer to several rivers:

Canada:
Broad River (Manitoba), a tributary of Hudson Bay

Jamaica:
Broad River (Jamaica)

United States:
Broad River (Carolinas), a tributary of the Congaree River
Broad River (Georgia)
Broad River (South Carolina), on the Atlantic coast
Broad River (Carolinas), North and South Carolina

See also
First Broad River
French Broad River
Second Broad River
Broad Creek (disambiguation)